Polly Namaye Bangambaki (née Polly Namaye) is a Ugandan communications professional, teacher and policewoman who serves as the Deputy Spokesperson for the Uganda Police Force since 2014.

Background and education
Namaye was born in Kabale District, in the Western Region of Uganda, to David Kabalega and Anne Kabalega.

She attended Kabale Primary School before she transferred to Maryhill High School, an all-girls boarding secondary school in the city of Mbarara for O-level studies. She completed her A-Level education at Bweranyangi Girls' Senior Secondary School, in Bushenyi, graduating with a high school diploma.

Her first degree, a Bachelor of Arts in Education, was awarded by Makerere University, Uganda's oldest and largest public university. She went on to obtain a Postgraduate Diploma in Human Resources Management from the Uganda Management Institute. Her second degree, a Master of Arts in Journalism and Communication, was awarded by Makerere University in 2019.

Career
Namaye worked as a school teacher in Kyenjojo District for a period of six months, until September 2007. She then switched careers and became a policewoman in 2007. Her basic police training, which involved academics, the law and internship, lasted until December 2008.

From January 2009 until April 2014, at the rank of Senior Superintendent of Police, she served as the regional police spokesperson for Mbarara Municipality. In April 2014, she was transferred to police head office in the Office of the Commissioner of Police. There, at the rank of Acting Assistant Commissioner of Police, she was appointed the Deputy-in-Command for the Press and Public Relations Office.

In 2016, Namaye was promoted to the rank of Assistant Commissioner of Police.

Family
Polly Namaye Bangambaki is married to Alfred Bangambaki and they are the parents of three children.

See also
 Kale Kayihura
 Martin Okoth Ochola

References

External links
 "Museveni Finally Confirms 985 Police Cadets". 20 June 2019.

Living people
1984 births
Ugandan journalists
Ugandan women journalists
Law enforcement in Uganda
Makerere University alumni
Uganda Management Institute alumni
People educated at Bweranyangi Girls' Senior Secondary School
People from Kabale District
People from Western Region, Uganda
People educated at Maryhill High School